William Wilder Heusner, Jr. (June 28, 1927 – August 9, 2002) was an American competition swimmer and Pan American Games champion.

Heusner represented the United States at the 1948 Summer Olympics in London, England.  He competed in the preliminary heats of the men's 400-meter freestyle and finished eighth in the final of the men's 1,500-meter freestyle.

At the 1951 Pan American Games, Heusner won the silver medal in the men's 400-meter freestyle. He was also a gold medal as a member of the winning U.S. team in the men's 4×200-meter freestyle relay event, alongside relay teammates Dick Cleveland, Burwell Jones, and Ronald Gora.

See also
 List of Northwestern University alumni

References
 

1927 births
2002 deaths
American male freestyle swimmers
Evanston Township High School alumni
Northwestern Wildcats men's swimmers
Olympic swimmers of the United States
Swimmers from Chicago
Swimmers at the 1948 Summer Olympics
Swimmers at the 1951 Pan American Games
Pan American Games gold medalists for the United States
Pan American Games silver medalists for the United States
Pan American Games medalists in swimming
Medalists at the 1951 Pan American Games
20th-century American people
21st-century American people